The Utah Olympic Park Jumps is a ski jumping venue at the Utah Olympic Park in Park City, Utah, United States. It is a venue in the FIS Ski jumping World Cup, and the host of 2002 Winter Olympics.

Salt Lake City won its 1995 bid to host the 2002 Winter Olympics, and plans were developed to expand the park. On October 9, 1997 SLOC approved the plan to spend an additional $48 million to upgrade and expand the recently completed park. The plans called for replacing and moving the existing 90-meter ski jump, and building a brand new 120-meter jump.

Venues of the 2002 Winter Olympics
Ski jumping venues in the United States
Sports venues in Salt Lake City